The Namibia'n national under-20 rugby union team represents Namibia at a junior national level.

Namibia participated at the 2014 Junior World Rugby Trophy and finished in 6th place. They qualified for the 2015 Under 20 Trophy after they defeated Kenya 52-17, at the finals of Rugby Africa's Under 19 Championship.

Current squad
Squad to 2014 IRB Junior World Rugby Trophy.

Management
Jood Opperman - Head Coach
Desiré Coetzee - Team Manager
Roger Thompson - Assistant Coach
Corne Ferreira - Physiotherapist
Vernon Morkel - Team Doctor
Charl Botha - Biomechanist

References

under-20
National under-20 rugby union teams